Shahriston is a station of the Tashkent Metro on Yunusobod Line. It was opened on 24 October 2001 as part of the inaugural section of the line, between Ming Orik and  Habib Abdullayev. Previously it was called Habib Abdullayev. On June 16, 2015 the station was renamed to "Shahristan" according to the decision of hakim (mayor) Tashkent. The station served the northern terminus of the line until 29 August 2020, when the line was extended north to Turkiston.

References 

Tashkent Metro stations
Railway stations opened in 2001
2001 establishments in Uzbekistan